Carlton is a historic home located at Falmouth, Stafford County, Virginia.  It was built about 1785, and is a two-story, five bay, Georgian style frame dwelling.  It has a hipped roof, interior end chimneys, and a front porch added about 1900.  The house measures approximately 48 feet by 26 feet.  Also on the property are the contributing frame kitchen partially converted to a garage, frame dairy, and brick meat house.

It was listed on the National Register of Historic Places in 1973. It is located in the Falmouth Historic District.

References

Houses on the National Register of Historic Places in Virginia
Georgian architecture in Virginia
Houses completed in 1785
National Register of Historic Places in Stafford County, Virginia
Houses in Stafford County, Virginia
Individually listed contributing properties to historic districts on the National Register in Virginia